Next generation of display technology is any display technology considered likely to outperform current display technology like LCD or OLED.

List of next generation display technologies

References

Display technology
Emerging technologies